Nelphe carolina, the Florida eucereon or Little Carol's wasp moth, is a moth of the subfamily Arctiinae. The species was first described by Henry Edwards in 1887. It is found in southern Texas, Florida, Mexico and on Cuba.

Adults have been recorded on wing year round.

The larvae feed on Cynanchum species.

References

Moths described in 1887
Euchromiina